The IX World Rhythmic Gymnastics Championships were held in London, Great Britain on 4 and 5 July 1979.

Medal table

Individuals

Rope

Ball

Clubs

Ribbon

All-around

Groups

References 

Rhythmic Gymnastics World Championships
Rhythmic Gymnastics Championships
World Rhythmic Gymnastics Championships
World Rhythmic Gymnastics Championships
World Rhythmic Gymnastics Championships
World Rhythmic Gymnastics Championships
International gymnastics competitions hosted by the United Kingdom